Thanh Lâm may refer to several places in Vietnam:

Thanh Lâm, Hanoi, a rural commune of Mê Linh District
Thanh Lâm, Bắc Giang, a rural commune of Lục Nam District
Thanh Lâm, Nghệ An, a rural commune of Thanh Chương District
Thanh Lâm, Quảng Ninh, a rural commune of Ba Chẽ District
Thanh Lâm, Thanh Hóa, a rural commune of Như Xuân District